Wolverhampton was a parliamentary constituency centred on the town of Wolverhampton in Staffordshire.  It elected two Members of Parliament to the House of Commons of the Parliament of the United Kingdom.

History

The constituency was created under the Great Reform Act, and first used at the 1832 general election.  It was abolished by the Redistribution of Seats Act 1885, when it was replaced for the 1885 general election by three new single-member constituencies: Wolverhampton East, Wolverhampton South and Wolverhampton West.

Members of Parliament

Election results

Elections in the 1830s

Elections in the 1840s

Elections in the 1850s

Villiers was appointed Judge-Advocate-General of the Armed Forces, requiring a by-election.

Bethell was appointed Attorney General for England and Wales, requiring a by-election.

Villiers was appointed President of the Poor Law Board, requiring a by-election.

Elections in the 1860s
Bethell resigned after being appointed Lord Chancellor, causing him to become Lord Westbury and a by-election to be called.

Elections in the 1870s

Elections in the 1880s

See also
List of Members of Parliament for Wolverhampton
List of parliamentary constituencies in Wolverhampton

References 

Parliamentary constituencies in Wolverhampton
Parliamentary constituencies in the West Midlands (county) (historic)
Parliamentary constituencies in Staffordshire (historic)
Constituencies of the Parliament of the United Kingdom established in 1832
Constituencies of the Parliament of the United Kingdom disestablished in 1885